The Web of Indian Life (1904) is a book written by Sister Nivedita. This book is a collection of essays and created a sensation when it was first published. The introduction of the book was written by Rabindranath Tagore.

Theme 
In these essays of the book, Nivedita discussed on several topics of India, lives of Indians and Hindu people. She also discussed some of the aspects of Indian life such as the caste system, the role and position of women in society, the Indian (Vedic) concept of birth and death, Indian pilgrimages, the invasion of Islam in India, etc.

References

External links 
 Full text at Sacred Texts
 Full book at archive.org

Indian non-fiction books
1904 non-fiction books
English-language books
Books by Sister Nivedita
Books about India
20th-century Indian books
Essay collections